Fares-Maathodaa (Dhivehi: ފަރެސްމާތޮޑާ) is one of the inhabited islands of Gaafu Dhaalu Atoll. Fares and Maathoda was originally two separate islands until they were joined by the reclamation of the shallow water passage between them during 1990s. Today, unified as one, the locals livelihood is mostly dependent on fishing.

Geography

Demography

References

Islands of the Maldives